SS-Gefolge was the designation for the group of female civilian employees of the Schutzstaffel during the Era of National Socialism in Nazi Germany. SS-Gefolge members were only allowed to serve the Schutzstaffel in a very limited capacity as the organisation was not formally a part of the SS. Members of the Gefolge worked in the Nazi concentration camps as guards and nurses.

Recruitment 
During the early stages of the war the Gefolge was primarily staffed by volunteers, but as the war progressed on more women were either conscripted or recruited from wartime factories with the false promise of high pay and easier working conditions.

Training 
Virtually all of the Gefolge recruits were trained at Ravensbrück, trainees would have spent anywhere from one week to six months receiving instruction on disciplinary techniques, subterfuge detection, and escape prevention. Recruits were instructed to show no sympathy for their prisoners and any Gefolge member suspected of helping a prisoner was severely punished.

In Concentration Camps 
By mid-January 1945, around 3,500 women were said to have been on guard duty in the concentration camps, along with around 37,000 men. In general, based on the sparse literature on this subject, it is assumed that around 10% of the concentration camp guards were women. In addition to 8,000 SS men, about 200 female guards were on duty in the Auschwitz concentration camp between May 1940 and January 1945. SS Gefolge Women were the main Guards at female specific concentration camps of Ravensbrück, Auschwitz-Birkenau, Mauthausen, and Bergen-Belsen. Male SS members were not permitted to enter the female camps.

Notable members of the Gefolge 
 Jenny Wanda Barkmann
 Elisabeth Becker
 Erna Beilhardt
 Erika Bergmann
 Jane Bernigau
 Dorothea Binz
 Grete Boesel
 Johanna Bormann
 Hertha Bothe
 Therese Brandl
 Hermine Braunsteiner-Ryan
 Luise Danz
 Margot Drechsel
 Hertha Ehlert
 Else Ehrich
 Irma Grese
 Martha Haake
 Wanda Klaff
 Liesbeth Krzok
 Hildegard Lächert
 Johanna Langefeld
 Elisabeth Lupka
 Maria Mandl
 Elisabeth Marschall
 Margarete Mewes
 Elfriede Mohneke
 Ruth Neudeck
 Alice Orlowski
 Ewa Paradies
 Margarete Rabe
 Gertrud Rabestein
 Elfriede Rinkel
 Ida Schreiter
 Gerda Steinhoff
 Maria Stromberger
 Inge Viermetz
 Elisabeth Volkenrath
 Erna Wallisch
 Emma Zimmer

Literature 
 Simone Erpel (Hrsg.): Im Gefolge der SS: Aufseherinnen des Frauen-KZ Ravensbrück. Begleitband zur Ausstellung. Metropol Verlag, Berlin 2007, ISBN 978-3-938690-19-2.
 Ljiljana Heise: KZ-Aufseherinnen vor Gericht: Greta Bösel – “another of those brutal types of women”? Lang, Frankfurt am Main / Berlin / Bern / Wien 2009, ISBN 978-3-631-58465-1 (Zugleich Magisterarbeit an der FU Berlin 2007 unter dem Titel: Der erste Ravensbrück-Prozess (1946/47) und die Frage der Täterschaft von Frauen im Nationalsozialismus).
 Anette Kretzer: NS-Täterschaft und Geschlecht. Der erste britische Ravensbrück-Prozess 1946/47 in Hamburg. Metropol, Berlin 2009, ISBN 978-3-940938-17-6.
 Elissa Mailänder Koslov: Gewalt im Dienstalltag: Die SS-Aufseherinnen des Konzentrations- und Vernichtungslagers Majdanek 1942-1944. ISBN 3-86854-212-4, Dissertation, 520 Seiten mit 20 Abbildungen, Hamburger Edition, 2009. Interview mit der Autorin im Deutschlandfunk, Studiozeit, aus Kultur- und Sozialwissenschaften, Sendung vom 8. Oktober 2009.
 Jutta Mühlenberg: Das SS-Helferinnenkorps. Ausbildung, Einsatz und Entnazifizierung der weiblichen Angehörigen der Waffen-SS. Hamburger Edition, 2011, ISBN 978-3-86854-239-4.
 Silke Schäfer: Zum Selbstverständnis von Frauen im Konzentrationslager. Das Lager Ravensbrück. Berlin 2002 (Dissertation TU Berlin), .
 Claudia Taake: Angeklagt: SS-Frauen vor Gericht. Diplomarbeit an der Universität Oldenburg, Bis, Oldenburg 1998, ISBN 3-8142-0640-1.
 Jan Stetter: Täter und Täterinnen. Referat am historischen Seminar der Universität Hannover fundus.org (PDF; 43 kB; 6 Seiten)
 L. Heid: Die vergessenen Rädchen. Süddeutsche Zeitung, 17. Mai 2010.

References 



Women in Nazi Germany
Nazi Party organizations
Nazi SS

de:SS-Gefolge
ru:Свита СС
sr:Жене у Шуцштафелу
uk:Свита СС